Michael Kinsey is an American clinical psychologist, psychotherapist and author. He is known for his work with parent-child attachment, personality psychology, and abusive power and control in interpersonal relationships. He is also the founder and publisher of the psychology blog Mindsplain.

Biography

Early life and education 
He received his doctoral degree in clinical psychology from The New School for Social Research, where he was editor of The New School Psychology Bulletin from 2012 to 2013. He was a postdoctoral fellow at Lenox Hill Hospital and Williamsburg Therapy Group in Brooklyn.

He also trained in the World Trade Center Mental Health Program at Mount Sinai School of Medicine, The Bronx Lebanon Hospital Center, and the Baruch College Counseling Center.

Career 
He was awarded the American Psychiatric Association Excellence in Psychology Award in 2010.

From 2013 to 2017, he taught several undergraduate and graduate psychology courses at The New School, including fundamentals in personality psychology, diagnostic assessment, and abnormal psychology.

Kinsey is in private practice and is a staff psychologist at the Williamsburg Therapy Group.

In 2021, Dr. Kinsey held a workshop on the topic of The Dynamics of the Narcissistic Personality in the Context of Coercive Control at America's Conference To End Coercive Control. The workshop was based on his Model of the Emotional Dynamics of the Narcissistic Personality.

Theory

Emotional dynamics of pathological narcissism 
In Kinsey's model, narcissism is a personality trait that exists on a continuum and does not manifest uniformly. In its most extreme form, it may manifest as narcissistic personality disorder.

Healthy narcissism 
Kinsey postulates that healthy narcissism is the ability to invest love in oneself and other people. It is neither exploitative nor harmful to self or others, whereas with narcissistic personality disorder love is self-directed only.

He explains:We’re not all narcissistic in the same way, or to the same degree, but we do all have narcissistic tendencies. Not only is self-absorption universal, it's also a vital aspect of health.Kinsey identifies the main attributes of healthy narcissism as:

 Being able to admire others and accept admiration.
 Believing in the importance of your contributions.
 Feeling gratitude and appreciation not guilt.
 Empathizing with others but prioritize self.
 Embodying self-efficacy, persistence and resilience.
 Respecting the self in health habits and boundaries.
 Being confident in being seen.
 Tolerating other's disapproval.
 Creating goals and pursue them with desire.
 Being attentive to the external world.
 Being aware of emotions.

Works 
Kinsey is the author of Transcendent Parenting: A Workbook for Parents Sharing Children with Narcissists and a children's book called Dreams of Zugunruhe.

Articles 
In 2021, his article What are Attachment Styles and How Do They Influence Adult Behavior appeared in Choosing Therapy.

See also 

 Attachment theory
 Child development
 Culture of Narcissism
 Healthy narcissism
 Narcissism

References 

21st-century American writers
21st-century American non-fiction writers
American children's writers
American male bloggers
American bloggers
American psychoanalysts
American publishers (people)
American writers
Cognitive-behavioral psychotherapists
Living people
Mental health professionals
Psychoanalysts
Psychotherapists
Year of birth missing (living people)
American clinical psychologists